Muhammad Zahid bin Mat Arip (born 22 June 1966) is a member of the Dewan Negara and is a former political secretary to the Prime Minister, Mahathir Mohamad along with Abu Bakar Yahya and Mohamad Nuhairi Tan Sri Rahmat. He is also a Member of the Supreme Leadership Council of the United Indigenous Party.

Family
He is the grandson of the former Deputy Prime Minister, Abdul Ghafar Baba. His uncle is Tamrin bin Abdul Ghafar who was once active in the United Malays National Organization and subsequently transferred to the Islamic Party.

Politics
He was a former United Malays National Organization member before joining United Indigenous Party. After joining United Indigenous Party, he was appointed as a Member of the party's Supreme Leadership Council.

In the general elections in 2018, he contested for the Pekan district, but lost to the incumbent, Najib Razak.

References

Malaysian Muslims
Living people
1966 births
Malaysian United Indigenous Party politicians
Former United Malays National Organisation politicians